East Riverside is a neighborhood of the city of New Orleans.  A subdistrict of the Central City/Garden District Area, its boundaries as defined by the City Planning Commission are: Magazine Street to the north, Toledano Street to the east, Tchoupitoulas Street to the south and Napoleon Avenue to the west.

Geography

Adjacent Neighborhoods
 Touro (north)
 Irish Channel (east & south)
 West Riverside (west)

Demographics
As of the census of 2000, there were 3,220 people, 1,386 households, and 709 families residing in the neighborhood.  The population density was 12,880 /mi2 (5,367 /km2).

As of the census of 2010, there were 2,699 people, 1,324 households, and 600 families residing in the neighborhood.

See also
 New Orleans neighborhoods

References

Neighborhoods in New Orleans